Shorea atrinervosa is a species of plant in the family Dipterocarpaceae. The species name is derived from Latin (ater = dull black and nervosus = nerved) and refers to leaf venation which is black in herbarium specimens.

S. atrinervosa is found in Peninsular Malaysia, Sumatra and Borneo. It is found in at least four protected areas (Ulu Telupid and Bidu Bidu Forest Reserves and Lambir and Gunung Mulu National Parks).

References

atrinervosa
Trees of Sumatra
Trees of Peninsular Malaysia
Trees of Borneo
Vulnerable plants